The 2017–18 Serie A (women) was the 51st season of the women's football top level league in Italy. Fiorentina were the defending champions. Juventus won the league title in their first ever season.

Teams

Twelve teams will compete in the league, with many changes among the make up of the league compared to last season.

Four teams were relegated at the end of the 2016-17 season.  Jesina, Luserna and Chieti finished at the bottom of the league, with Como 2000 losing a relegation playoff to San Zaccaria.

Reggiana won promotion from Serie B, but their license was taken over by Sassuolo.  Other promoted teams were Empoli, Valpolicella and Pink Bari.

Cuneo, who finished seventh in Serie A last season, sold their license to Juventus.

League table
Brescia sold their Serie A spot to AC Milan after the season, who created a women's team. They were not allowed to enter the Champions League therefore. The tied third placed teams played a play-off for the vacant spot.

Playoffs

Championship playoff
After finishing tied on points at the end of the regular season, Juventus and Brescia will play-off to decide the winner of the league title.

Champions League playoff
Brescia were bought by Milan after the season, and lost the right to enter the UEFA Women's Champions League. Since Tavagnacco and Fiorentina finished tied on points in third place, and a play-off was played determine which team enter as the replacement team.

Relegation playoff
After finishing tied on points after the end of the regular season, Pink Bari and San Zaccaria will play to decide the second relegated club.  The winning club will advance to a play-out with Serie B teams, while the losing club will be relegated to Serie B for 2018-19.

Results

Season statistics

Scoring

Top scorers

References

2017-18
2017–18 domestic women's association football leagues
Women
1